Gladstone is an unincorporated urban community in the Municipality of WestLake – Gladstone within the Canadian province of Manitoba that held town status prior to January 1, 2015. It is located on the Yellowhead Highway at the intersection with Highway 34. The Gladstone railway station receives Via Rail service.

History 
The first known name for the area was Third Crossing as this was a third crossing over the Whitemud River. When settlement became significant in 1872 the community was renamed to Palestine. The community was incorporated in 1879 and was renamed a third and final time to Gladstone, after the British Prime Minister of the time William Ewart Gladstone.

Demographics 

Happy Rock 

Gladstone is often referred to as "Happy Rock". This is the name given to the community's monument located along Highway 16 which acts as the symbol and mascot of the community. The Happy Rock monument also acts as the visitor information centre and is a vital part of the tourism in the community. On July 5, 2010, Canada Post made a commemorative stamp of the Happy Rock as part of its Roadside Attractions collection.

Climate

Notable people
W. L. Morton, Canadian historian
Andy Murray, former NHL head coach
David Guillas, guitarist, former member of Propagandhi, currently plays in the band Agassiz

References 

 Town of Gladstone Community Profile
 Third Crossing: A History of the Town and District of Gladstone in the Province of Manitoba (1946) Margaret Morton Fahrni and W.L. Morton, Winnipeg.

Designated places in Manitoba
Former towns in Manitoba
Populated places disestablished in 2015
2015 disestablishments in Manitoba